Magdalena Milpas Altas is a town and municipality in the Guatemalan department of Sacatepéquez.

As of the 2018 census, the population of the municipality is 11,856

References

External links
Municipality of Magdalena Milpas Altas — Official site

Municipalities of the Sacatepéquez Department